Thirst is an album by Randy Stonehill, released in 1998 on Brentwood Music.

Track listing
All songs written by Randy Stonehill, except "Fire", written by Randy Stonehill and Jimmy Abegg; "Sleeping", written by Randy Stonehill and Phil Madeira; and "Little Rose", and "Everything You Know (Is Incorrect)" written by Randy Stonehill and David Edwards.

Side one
 "Hand of God"  – 4:15
 "Fire"  – 5:52
 "Sleeping"  – 4:11
 "Father of Lights"  – 4:11
 "Angels' Wings"  – 5:24

Side two
 "Baby Hates Clowns"  – 4:03
 "Every Heartbeat Is A Prayer"  – 5:03
 "Lonely House"  – 3:32
 "Little Rose"  – 5:17
 "Everything You Know (Is Incorrect)"  – 3:23
 "Keeper of the Bear (CD-only track)

Personnel 

 Randy Stonehill – vocals, guitars
 Tom Howard – acoustic piano, string arrangements, backing vocals
 Phil Madeira – Hammond B3 organ, accordion
 Stuart Adamson – guitars (1)
 Rick Elias – guitars, backing vocals
 Jerry McPherson – guitars, Indian lap dulcimer, banjo, portachord
 Jackie Street – bass 
 Matt Pierson – bass 
 Chris McHugh – drums
 Bob Sale – drums
 Russ Long – percussion 
 Tammy Rogers – violin
 The Nashville String Machine – strings
 Linda Elias – backing vocals

Production 

 Rick Elias – producer
 Dean Diehl – executive producer
 Ray Ware – executive producer
 Recorded at The White House, The Carport, Buya Studio and Sound Stage Studios (Nashville, Tennessee).
 Russ Long – engineer
 Gregg Jampol – additional engineer
 Chris Grainger – assistant engineer
 Tara Wilson – assistant engineer
 J.R. McNeely – mixing at The Sound Kitchen (Franklin, Tennessee)
 Todd Gunnerson  – mix assistant
 Mat5t (Matt Weeks) – mix assistant
 Hank Williams – mastering at MasterMix (Nashville, Tennessee)
 Spectrasonics – loops
 Jimmy Abegg – art direction
 Scott Hughes – art direction
 Shawn Stewart – design for Provident Music Group
 Ben Pearson – photography

References 

1998 albums
Randy Stonehill albums